Glen Grant may refer to:

 Glen Grant (historian) (1947–2003), Hawaiian historian, author and folklorist
 Glen Grant distillery, single malt Scotch distillery
 Glen Grant, lieutenant colonel, British military expert